Living Proof: The Hank Williams Jr. Story is a 1983 American made-for-television biographical film directed by Dick Lowry and starring Richard Thomas. The plot roughly follows the semi-autobiographical book Living Proof by Michael Bane and Hank Williams Jr.. The film's score was composed and conducted by Bill Conti.

Cast
Richard Thomas as Hank Williams Jr.
Lenora May as Lisa
Liane Langland as June Bradshaw Williams
Ann Gillespie as Becky
Merle Kilgore as himself
Clu Gulager as J.R. Smith
Allyn Ann McLerie as Audrey Williams
Barton Heyman as Bobby Deane
Noble Willingham as Dr. Graham
Jay O. Sanders as Dick Willey
Christian Slater as Walt Willey

References

External links

1983 television films
1983 films
American biographical films
Biographical films about musicians
Country music films
Films directed by Dick Lowry
Films scored by Bill Conti
NBC network original films
USA Network original programming
1980s English-language films
1980s American films